Kodivayal is a village in the  
Aranthangirevenue block of Pudukkottai district, Tamil Nadu, India.

Demographics 

As per the 2001 census, Kodivayal-EAST had a total population of 
2589 with 1319 males and 1270 females. Out of the total population  
1612 people were literate.

References

Villages in Pudukkottai district